The Ministry of Water Resources, River Development and Ganga Rejuvenation was the apex body for formulation and administration of rules and regulations relating to the development and regulation of the water resources in India. The Ministry was formed in January 1985 following the bifurcation of the then Ministry of Irrigation and Power, when the Department of Irrigation was re-constituted as the Ministry of Water Resources. In July 2014, the Ministry was renamed to “Ministry of Water Resources, River Development & Ganga Rejuvenation”, making it the National Ganga River Basin Authority for conservation, development, management, and abatement of pollution in the river Ganges and its tributaries. In May 2019, this ministry was merged with Ministry of Drinking Water and Sanitation to form the Ministry of Jal Shakti.

Organisations
 Bansagar Control Board
 Betwa River Board
 Brahmaputra Board
 Central Ground Water Board
 Central Soil and Materials Research Station  
 Central Water and Power Research Station  
 Central Water Commission
 Farakka Barrage Project 
 Ganga Flood Control Commission 
 Narmada Control Authority 
 National Institute of Hydrology, Roorkee
 National Projects Construction Corporation Limited
 National Water Development Agency
 North Eastern Regional Institute of Water and Land Management (NERIWALM)
 Sardar Sarovar Construction Advisory Committee
 Tungabhadra Board
 Upper Yamuna River Board
 WAPCOS Limited

CGWA

Central Ground Water Authority (CGWA), created in 1970  under sub-section (3) of Section 3 of the Environment (Protection) Act 1986 under the Ministry of Water Resources of India, for regulation of ground water development to ensure long-term sustainability. It is responsible for "providing scientific inputs for management, exploration, monitoring, assessment, augmentation and regulation of ground water resources of the country." It is a multi-disciplinary scientific entity comprising Hydrologists, Hydrometeorologists, Hydrogeologists, Geophysicists, Chemists,  and Engineers. It is headquartered at NH-19 (old NH-4) in Faridabad in Haryana.

It has following 4 wings: 
 Sustainable Management & Liaison (SML)
 Survey, Assessment & Monitoring (SAM)
 Exploratory Drilling & Materials Management (ED&MM) 
 Water Quality & Training and Technology Transfer (WQ&TT)

Ministers

Projects
 Indian Rivers Inter-link

References

External links
 Ministry website

 
Defunct government ministries of India
Water management authorities